Wittmann Antal park is a multi-purpose stadium in Mosonmagyaróvár, Hungary. It is currently used mostly for football matches, is the home ground of Mosonmagyaróvári TE and holds 4,000 people.

References

Football venues in Hungary
Buildings and structures in Győr-Moson-Sopron County